Njáll is an old Viking given name native to Iceland and other Scandinavian countries.  It was borrowed from the Old Irish name Niall.

People with this name
Njáll Þorgeirsson, character in Njall Saga

References

Icelandic masculine given names
Old Norse personal names